Thais tricolorata is a species of sea snail, a marine gastropod mollusk, in the family Muricidae, the murex snails or rock snails.

Description
The length of the shell attains 27.3 mm

Distribution
This marine species occurs off Madagascar.

References

tricolorata
Gastropods described in 2010